Joy Division is a 2007 British documentary film on the British post-punk band Joy Division, directed by Grant Gee.

The film  assembles TV clips, newsreel, pictures of modern Manchester and Manchester in the  late 1970s, and interviews. The interviewees include the three surviving members of the group, Tony Wilson, Peter Saville, Pete Shelley (of Buzzcocks), Genesis Breyer P-Orridge (of Throbbing Gristle), Alan Hempsall (of Crispy Ambulance), Paul Morley, Terry Mason, Richard Boon,  Anton Corbijn, and Belgian journalist Annik Honoré, with whom Ian Curtis was having an affair.

Film critic Philip French: "Someone says in the film that the revolutionary step they made was to progress from the usual punk group's angry statement: 'Fuck you.' Joy Division were the first to say: 'We're fucked.' There is a particularly impressive sequence in which dark, despairing tracks of urban alienation and angst from the 1979 album Unknown Pleasures are accompanied by a speeded-up nocturnal journey around Manchester. It has the hallucinatory sci-fi feeling of Jean-Luc Godard's Alphaville." The person being quoted was Tony Wilson.

References

External links
 
 
 
 Joy Division at the 2007 Toronto International Film Festival

2007 films
British documentary films
Rockumentaries
Joy Division
2007 documentary films
2000s English-language films
2000s British films
English-language documentary films